Louis Klemantaski was a British photographer and was said to have invented the art of motor racing photography.

Early life
He was born in what was then Manchuria on 12 February 1912, to a Russian mother and Dutch-born British father of Polish heritage who imported Willys-Overland vehicles into the country.

His love of photography started when he received a camera for his 10th birthday, shortly before the family moved back to Britain for his secondary education and to escape the plague which was spreading in Harbin.

He graduated from King's College in London, however his love of photography and cars combined when he started racing single seater sports cars around nearby racing circuits such as Brooklands. He befriended many drivers, and after retiring from racing following a motorcycle crash in 1933, began taking action shots and selling the resulting photos to the drivers.

Career
During the war, he joined the Department of Miscellaneous Weapons Development where he photographed new weapons being deployed as part of their assessment. Most famously, he photographed Barnes Wallis' Bouncing Bombs to record their size, trajectory and speed.

Whilst he photographed and published books on several marques, he is most closely associated with Aston Martin. He was asked to take pictures of the new Lagonda in 1947, and when David Brown bought that company the same year to merge with Aston Martin, Klemantaski came too. He then did most of the advertising photography for the next 10 years and more, and followed the racing team during a golden period which peaked with the triumph at Le Mans in 1959 and victory in the world sportscar championship.

As well as being beside the circuit during races such as Le Mans and the Spa 24, he also sat in the passenger seat during 3 Monte Carlo rallies and 5 Mille Miglias, documenting the exploits of those in the driving seat. These included acting as navigator/photographer for his great friends Reg Parnell (1954 Mille Miglia in an Aston DB3S), Paul Frere (1955 Mille Miglia in an Aston DB2) and Peter Collins (1956 Mille Miglia in a Ferrari 860 Monza). 

In one of his most famous photos he was there to capture the moment that Carroll Shelby crossed the line to take the 1959 Le Mans victory in an Aston DBR1/300.

With Aston Martin achieving their ambition, they decided to quit sportscar racing, and Klemantaski decided this was his moment to retire from working with Aston Martin, frustrated by new safety regulations which forced him further from the action and saddened by the death of his friend Peter Collins. He then devoted his time to portrait photography, though he continued to attend and photograph at sportscar events until his permanent retirement in 1974. 

He published many collections of his photographs during his life, including limited editions such as 'Klemantaski & Aston Martin' with Chris Nixon in 1998, the last one before his death aged 89 in 2001.

In 1989, he sold his entire library to Peter Sachs, who established the Klemantaski collection, combining Louis' work with a dozen other car photographers in an archive which lists in excess of 50,000 motor sport images.

References

External links

Peter Sachs' collection can be viewed online at  archived at 

1912 births
2001 deaths
20th-century British photographers
portrait photographers
Sports photographers
Chinese emigrants to the United Kingdom